Edward James Carpenter (born 10 September 1982) is an English cricketer.  Carpenter is a right-handed batsman who bowls slow left-arm orthodox.  He was born in Hammersmith, London and educated at Marlborough College.

While studying for his degree at Durham University, Carpenter made his first-class debut for Durham UCCE against Durham in 2004.  He made two further first-class appearances in 2004, against Northamptonshire and Derbyshire.  In his three first-class matches, he failed to score any runs in four batting innings,  With the ball, he took just a single wicket which came at an overall cost of 155.00.

References

External links
Ed Carpenter at ESPNcricinfo
Ed Carpenter at CricketArchive

1982 births
Living people
People from Hammersmith
Cricketers from Greater London
People educated at Marlborough College
English cricketers
Durham MCCU cricketers